Drunk Driving is a 1939 American short drama film directed by David Miller. It was nominated for an Academy Award at the 12th Academy Awards in 1940 for Best Live Action Short Film, Two-Reel.

Cast
 Dick Purcell as John Jones
 Jo Ann Sayers as Mrs. Jones
 Richard Lane as Rick

References

External links

1939 films
1939 drama films
1939 short films
American drama films
American black-and-white films
Metro-Goldwyn-Mayer short films
Films directed by David Miller
1930s English-language films
1930s American films